Mohammad Abdul Bari Institute of Juridical Science is a private law college in Domkal, Murshidabad,  West Bengal. It was established by Maniknagar Social Welfare Society in the year 2008. The college is affiliated to University of Kalyani and also approved by the Bar Council of India.

Courses 
The college offers a five-years integrated B.A. LL.B. (Hons.) course.

See also

References

External links 
MABIJS
University of Kalyani
University Grants Commission
National Assessment and Accreditation Council

Law schools in West Bengal
Universities and colleges in Murshidabad district
Colleges affiliated to University of Kalyani
Educational institutions established in 2008
2008 establishments in West Bengal